Pakistan Maritime Museum  is a maritime museum and park situated near PNS Karsaz on Habib Ibrahim Rehmatullah Road (Karsaz Road) in Karachi, Sindh, Pakistan.

The main museum building is located inside the park of 28 acres. The museum also displays Daphné-class submarine PNS Hangor (S131), the minesweeper, PNS Mujahid (M164), a Breguet Atlantic aircraft, and a wooden barge that was given to the Naval Chief by the Queen in the 1960s.

See also
Pakistan Air Force Museum
Pakistan Army Museum, Rawalpindi
List of museums in Pakistan

References

External links
 Pakistan Maritime Museum
 Museum in Karachi — CDGK
 Pakistan Navy official website
 Pakistan Marine Academy official website

Pakistan Navy
Maritime museums in Pakistan
Museums in Karachi
1954 establishments in Pakistan
Tourist attractions in Karachi
Naval museums
Auditoriums in Pakistan